The Fundación para el Progreso ("Foundation for Progress", FPP) is a Chilean libertarian think tank. Founded in 2012, its chief financial officer is Nicolás Ibáñez Scott, and its executive director is political scientist Axel Kaiser. The FPP has received support from Quiñenco Group and the Luksic Foundation.

The FPP's activity coincides with the concept of an "advocacy center", created by scholars such as James McGann, Diane Stone and Thomas Medvetz. The think tank styles itself as analogous to the Cato Institute.

Since 2016, the FPP has gained prominence through its YouTube channel. According to some pundits, the think tank increased its influence after the re-election of Sebastián Piñera to the Chilean presidency in 2018.
The FPP defended the continuity of the government in the midst of the 2019−2020 social crisis in the country.

Further reading
 Alenda, Stéphanie, Anatomy of the Chilean right-wing: State, market and values in times of changes. Santiago, Chile, Fondo de Cultura Económica, 2020.
 Medvetz, Thomas, Think Tanks in America: Power, Politics, and the New Form of Intellectual Engagement. Chicago, University of Chicago Press, 2012.
 McGann, James and Weaver, R. Kent, "Think Tanks and Civil Societies: Catalyst for Ideas and Action". Transaction Publishers, 2000.
 Rodríguez, Gina Paola, "Right-wing think tanks and gender discourses in Chile". Revista de Temas Sociológicos. N°27. 2020, pp. 91-125
 Stone, Diane, "Think Tank Transnationalisation and Non-profit Analysis, Advice and Advocacy". Global Society. N°14. Vol. 2, pp. 153−172

References

External links
 

Think tanks based in Chile
Libertarian think tanks
Think tanks established in 2015
Libertarianism in Chile